Robert Bell Hamilton (20 October 1892 – 15 May 1948) was a notable Australian architect and also Member of the Legislative Assembly for the State electoral district of Toorak in Victoria.

Biography
Robert Bell Hamilton's architectural works include some of the most expensive properties in Toorak, Melbourne's richest suburb. He was Victoria's foremost practitioner of the inter-war Old English/Tudor Revival style during the 1930s. Hamilton aided in the design, along with the firm Prevost Synnot and Rewald, of the heritage-listed Bruce Manor, former estate of Australian Prime Minister Stanley Bruce. For his contribution to Victorian architecture Hamilton was appointed as a Fellow of the Royal Victorian Institute of Architects in 1931.

Hamilton served as a Councillor on Prahran City Council for Toorak Ward and then Mornington Shire Council. He later served as President of Mornington Shire Council, and subsequently became the Member for Toorak for the Liberal and Country Party in the November 1945 election that saw the Labor Party win a small majority over their coalition counterparts. During his short time in Parliament, Hamilton sat on the Public Works Committee and the Library Committee.

Hamilton died in 1948 at Mornington Nursing Hospital before serving a full-term in office. In an obituary published in The Standard, the then President of Mornington Shire Council wrote:His work and his planning for the future of Mornington have put us in his debt, and his name will be remembered because his energy and his ideas have been given for the future and the advancement of our district...I pay homage to Robert Bell Hamilton, a citizen with true public spirit and a man who discharged all obligations of friendship.The by-election triggered by his death, held in June 1948, saw the re-election of a Liberal and Country Party member, Edward Reynolds.

References

1892 births
1948 deaths
Architects from Melbourne
Members of the Victorian Legislative Assembly
Liberal Party of Australia members of the Parliament of Victoria
Australian military personnel of World War I
Australian Army soldiers
Victoria (Australia) local councillors
20th-century Australian politicians
People from East Melbourne
Politicians from Melbourne
Military personnel from Melbourne